Annica Gunilla Åhlén (born 17 January 1975 in Trångsund, Sweden) is a retired Swedish ice hockey goaltender. Åhlén first represented Team Sweden internationally at the 1990 IIHF Women's World Championship. In total, she has played in 16 world championships games, with a record of 7 wins, 8 losses and 1 tie. Åhlén played for Sweden at the 1998 and 2002 Winter Olympics, capturing a bronze medal in 2002.

References

External links
 

1975 births
Living people
Medalists at the 2002 Winter Olympics
Olympic ice hockey players of Sweden
People from Huddinge Municipality
Swedish women's ice hockey goaltenders
Olympic bronze medalists for Sweden
Ice hockey players at the 1998 Winter Olympics
Ice hockey players at the 2002 Winter Olympics
Sportspeople from Stockholm County